Work Out in the Zone (previously known as Work Out) is an American reality television series on Bravo, which premiered on July 19, 2006. The show is centered on fitness trainers and models located in the many cities of California. The first three seasons featured many of the trainers who work for fitness trainer Jackie Warner, and some other aspects of the gym and its clients as well as Warner's other fitness ventures, and private life. The third season of Work Out ended on June 10, 2008, and was subsequently canceled. A fourth season is currently held in production, with eight different trainers cast for the show. Warner will not return for the fourth season, after the network was not pleased with her interaction with the other trainers. The fourth season, which revamped the show's concept, mainly featured top fitness model and former army ranger Greg Plitt, who was the only cast member to return from the previous season.

Cast

Work Out: Seasons 1-3
In 2003, fitness expert Jackie Warner opened Sky Sport and Spa. On July 19, 2006, the Bravo network aired the first episode of Work Out (developed following Jackie's appearance on Jonathan Antin's Bravo reality series Blow Out). The show follows the day-to-day routine of Jackie and shows all of the drama that goes on behind the scenes in keeping a business afloat, while juggling her own personal life, as well as dealing with the personal issues of those who work for her as trainers.

Trainers
 Jackie Warner (2006-2008)
 Doug Blasdell (2006-2007)
 Brian Peeler (2006–2008)
 Jesse Brune (2006–2008)
 Gregg Butler (2007–2008)
 Rebecca Cardon (2006–2008)
 Erika Jacobson (2006–2008)
 Jesse "JD" Jordan (2008)
 Agostina Laneri (2008)
 Greg Plitt (2008)
 Andre Riley (2006–2007)
 Renessa Williams (2008)
 Jennifer "Zen" Gray (2006–2007)

Work Out in the Zone: Season 4
In 2011, top fitness model Greg Plitt signed an exclusive contract with Bravo to document his fitness ventures and other commercial projects for a soon-to-air reality television show. This led to Plitt bringing back the idea of reviving Work Out, in which he was one of the trainers. As Bravo has declined to include Jackie Warner, the main character of all previous three seasons, to join the show, Plitt decided to contact several of his friends in the industry who are fitness models and trainers to join him. Seven trainers were chosen and are willing to let the show document their personal and professional lives. Greg Plitt was killed by a train in Burbank, California while filming the show.  Plitt was in Burbank with two other people running on the tracks when he was hit by a Metrolink train a few minutes after 4 p.m., on Saturday, Jan 17th 2015.

Trainers

Greg Plitt
Tiffany Taylor

Reaction to the series

Early reactions
Variety's initial response to the show included these comments:

" ... It is Mimi [Jackie's girlfriend in the show's first two seasons] who is this show's dragon lady, a stunningly twisted personality even for reality TV."

"In the pilot episode, Warner was a bit self-conscious and stiff. But as time goes on she learns to loosen up and live with the constant presence of the cameras, and her story and drama unfold more naturally as the show becomes increasingly riveting."

References

External links
 

 Work Out on AfterEllen (review, interview, and recaps)

2000s American LGBT-related television series
2000s American reality television series
2006 American television series debuts
2008 American television series endings
Bravo (American TV network) original programming
English-language television shows
American LGBT-related reality television series